Nikola Budišić (Serbian Cyrillic: Никола Будишић; born 12 October 1947) is a retired Serbian footballer, most notably with FK Partizan. In total, he appeared in 348 matches for Partizan (127 domestic league outings).

He was one of the first foreign players of Panathinaikos after the fall of the Greek military junta in 1974. Today he is head of the Ajax Football School in Sremska Mitrovica and lives in Laćarak.

References

Living people
1947 births
Sportspeople from Sremska Mitrovica
Serbian footballers
Yugoslav footballers
Yugoslavia under-21 international footballers
Association football defenders
Yugoslav First League players
Super League Greece players
Eredivisie players
Belgian Pro League players
FK Partizan players
Panathinaikos F.C. players
NAC Breda players
K. Beringen F.C. players
Serbian expatriate footballers
Expatriate footballers in Greece
Expatriate footballers in the Netherlands
Expatriate footballers in Belgium